Kimba Maureen Wood (born January 21, 1944) is a senior United States district judge of the United States District Court for the Southern District of New York. Wood has presided over many high-profile cases involving such figures as "Junk Bond King" Michael Milken, Republican majority leader of the New York State Senate Dean Skelos, and Donald Trump's personal attorney, Michael Cohen. She is also known as "The Love Judge" after her alleged affair with Wall Street financier Frank Richardson.

Early life and education 
Wood was born in Port Townsend, Washington. Wood was named for the small town of Kimba, South Australia, which her mother saw in an atlas. Her father was a career officer and speechwriter in the United States Army. Wood lived in Europe during her youth, where her father was stationed in several places, and she received early education at the Sorbonne.

In 1965, Wood graduated cum laude from Connecticut College with a bachelor's degree in government. In 1966, she received a Master of Science in political theory from the London School of Economics. While in London, she spent five days training as a Playboy bunny, but quit before beginning to work at a club. She then earned a Juris Doctor from Harvard Law School in 1969, where there were fewer than twenty women in her class.

Career 
From 1969 to 1970, Wood was in private practice in Washington, D.C., working at Steptoe & Johnson where she was the only female attorney. From 1970 to 1971, she worked at the Office of Economic Opportunity. After relocating to New York City in 1971, Wood returned to private practice from 1971 to 1988, working as an antitrust law expert at the firm of LeBoeuf, Lamb, Leiby & MacRae. She became one of the first women to break into the male-dominated world of antitrust law, and became partner at LeBoeuf in 1978.

Federal judicial service
On December 18, 1987, based upon a recommendation from Senator Al D'Amato, Wood was nominated by President Ronald Reagan to a seat on the United States District Court for the Southern District of New York vacated by Judge Constance Baker Motley. Wood was confirmed by a unanimous United States Senate on April 19, 1988, and received her commission on April 20, 1988. She entered on duty on July 28, 1988. Wood was a member of the Judicial Conference of the United States from 2006 to 2007. She served as Chief Judge from 2006 to 2009 and assumed senior status on June 1, 2009.

Proposed nomination as Attorney General
In the Nannygate matter of 1993, Wood was Bill Clinton's second unsuccessful choice for United States Attorney General. Like Clinton's previous nominee, Zoë Baird, Wood had hired an illegal alien as a nanny, but unlike Baird, she had paid the required taxes on the employee. Wood employed the illegal immigrant at a time when it was legal to do so, before the Immigration Reform and Control Act of 1986 made the hiring of illegal immigrants unlawful. The threat of a repetition of the same controversy nevertheless led to the hasty withdrawal of Wood from consideration. Janet Reno was later nominated and confirmed for the post. White House officials said they were angry at Wood because she had not told Clinton and other officials about the nanny, even when she had been directly asked. In her statement, however, Wood said she had not misled the White House.

Notable cases 
One of Wood's notable decisions was sentencing Michael Milken, known as "The Junk Bond King", in 1990 to ten years in prison. In 1991, Milken's sentence was reduced to two years' imprisonment and three years' probation at the request of prosecutors, to reward his cooperation in other investigations.

In 1998, Wood presided over the case of the Greek Orthodox Patriarchate of Jerusalem v. Christie's, Inc., in which the ownership of the Archimedes Palimpsest was disputed. Wood also later presided over Leonard v. Pepsico, Inc., 88 F. Supp 2d 116 (S.D.N.Y. 1996), more widely known as the Pepsi Points Case.

On July 8, 2010, Wood was the presiding judge over the US case against ten alleged Russian 'illegals' involved in the Illegals Program. She accepted the defendants' guilty pleas and sentenced all ten to time served. The ten were then deported and exchanged for four prisoners previously held in Russia.

On October 26, 2010, Wood issued an injunction in Arista Records LLC v. Lime Group LLC, forcing LimeWire to disable "the searching, downloading, uploading, file trading and/or file distribution functionality, and/or all functionality" of its software. A trial investigating the damages necessary to compensate the affected record labels was held in 2011 and ended in a negotiated settlement.

On November 19, 2010, Wood received attention in connection with a letter to the court from Bennet M. Epstein, an attorney, who asked for time off from a trial to attend his then-unborn grandson's bris, if the baby proved to be a boy. In response, Wood wrote that Epstein would be permitted to attend the bris, but that "if a daughter is born, there will be a public celebration in court, with readings from poetry celebrating girls and women."

In 2016, Wood presided over the case against Dean Skelos,  Republican majority leader of the New York State Senate, who was accused of federal corruption charges.

In April 2018, Wood was assigned to preside over motions arising out of the search pursuant to warrant of the home and office of Michael Cohen, a personal attorney for Donald Trump.

Personal life
In 1970, Wood married Robert Lovejoy, a partner at Davis Polk & Wardwell. She went by the name Kimba Wood Lovejoy from 1970 to 1982, until the time of their divorce. In 1982, Wood married Time magazine political columnist Michael Kramer. They had a son, Ben, in 1986. The marriage ended in divorce. After separating from Kramer, Wood and former Harvard Law School classmate Frank E. Richardson II began dating, and they married in 1999. Wood was also known for an alleged affair resulting in the breakdown of Frank Richardson's marriage, earning her the nickname of "The Love Judge".

Leadership roles 
 2000–2001: Amherst College Board of Trustees
 Harvard Law School Association of New York City, President (one-year term)

Works and publications

References

External links

 Hon. Kimba M. Wood, United States District Judge at United States District Court for the Southern District of New York
 Kimba M. Wood at C-SPAN

1944 births
20th-century American judges
Alumni of the London School of Economics
Connecticut College alumni
Harvard Law School alumni
Judges of the United States District Court for the Southern District of New York
Living people
People from Port Townsend, Washington
Rejected or withdrawn nominees to the United States Executive Cabinet
United States district court judges appointed by Ronald Reagan
21st-century American judges
20th-century American women judges
21st-century American women judges